Drummond-Hay or Drummond Hay is a surname, and may refer to:

 Anneli Drummond-Hay, (1937-2022) Scottish equestrian and trainer
 Edward Hay Drummond Hay (1815–1884), British naval officer, diplomat and colonial administrator
 Grace Marguerite Hay Drummond-Hay (1895–1946), British journalist
 Henry Drummond-Hay (1814–1896), originally Henry Drummond, Scottish naturalist and ornithologist
 John Hay Drummond Hay (1816–1893), United Kingdom Envoy Extraordinary at the Court of Morocco